Mahak Hospital and Rehabilitation Complex is a Pediatric Cancer Research and Hospital Center built and organized by Mahak charity. The 120 bedroom complex focuses on the treatment and rehabilitation of children and providing support to their families during treatment.

History
From the beginning of Mahak's activities, the need for creating facilities to help children with cancer became the long-term goal of the organization. With the help of one of the friends of Mahak a piece of land located in Darabad heights was purchased through the Urban Land Organization. The project was left on hold however, due to lack of funding and the size of the project. At this stage a generous donor joined Mahak and provided funding to the tune of four times the original budget. That enabled Mahak to expand its plans from 2000 Sq. M. (21,000 sq. ft.) to 8000 Sq. M (86,000 sq. ft.).

The work began in year 2000 and the speed with which the building project was progressing encouraged the major sponsor to commit further funds to ensure the conclusion of the project and its further expansion to the limits set by building regulations. This increased the size of the project to twice the original plans. Finally in 2003 Mahak 's Hospital and Rehabilitation Center, was completed.

The two Rehabilitation wards in Mahak were set up and made operational with the help and co-ordination of the nursing group and social work department by August 2003.
The center is situated above the city's northeastern heights and boasts an 18000 square meters building with 120 rooms equipped to accommodate patients accompanied by one member of their families.

Facilities
The center houses diagnostic and treatment wards of the highest standards . There are also further facilities offered such as a Clinic, a Chemotherapy laboratory, Radiotherapy section, Physiotherapy ward, Water-therapy section, Operation rooms, M.R.I and CT-Scan, Radiology, ICU, Library, Children's playroom, Restaurant, an Amphitheatre and a Shopping center.

These various parts of the complex have been furnished with the help of charitable individuals and in order to appreciate their generosity, each section has been named after the donor. By February 2007, final operational permits were granted by the Ministry of Health and the opening ceremony was held in April 2007.

Oncology and Chemotherapy clinics of the hospital are offering daily services to children and the laboratory is routinely carrying out Biochemical, Hematological, Microbiological, And Hormonal tests. Spiral CT Scan, Digital Radiology, Sonography and MRI tests are offered using state of the art equipment and highly skilled supervision. The Radiotherapy section of the Mahak's Hospital is equipped with Liner Accelerator and Simulator.

References

Hospital buildings completed in 2003
Hospitals in Iran
Hospitals established in 2003
Buildings and structures in Tehran